This is a chronological list of all the artists and songs that have competed in the Junior Eurovision Song Contest from 2003 to 2022.

Entries

Withdrawn entries 

This list presents all the cases when a country withdrew or was disqualified from the contest.

See also
 List of Eurovision Song Contest entries

References

External links

Entries
Lists of songs
Lists of singers